= Joseph Maloney (fugitive) =

Joseph Maloney is an American fugitive in Ireland.
